Ruijan Kaiku (Kven/Finnish: "Echo of Finnmark") is a bilingual newspaper (Kven/Finnish and Norwegian) that is published in Tromsø, Norway.

History and profile
Ruijan Kaiku was established in 1995. At the start two issues were published each month, but due to financial problems currently only a single issue is published per month. The newspaper is about 8-pages and is in a tabloid format. Its chief editor is, and has been since the start, Liisa Koivulehto. 

The newspaper writes mostly about Kven issues, and about the work of strengthening Kven language and culture in Norway. In addition the paper has stories about other Kven organizations in Norway, and about other Finnic minorities in the Nordic and surrounding countries.

References

External links
 Homepage

Kven culture
Newspapers published in Norway
Mass media in Tromsø